Andrew Kennedy (July 24, 1810 – December 31, 1847) was an American lawyer and politician who served three terms as a U.S. Representative from Indiana from 1841 to 1847.

He was a cousin of Case Broderick.

Biography 
Born in Dayton, Ohio, Kennedy moved with his parents to a farm on the Indian reserve near Lafayette, Indiana. He soon afterward moved to Connersville, Indiana, where he became a blacksmith's apprentice.  Kennedy attended the common schools and later studied law. He was admitted to the bar in 1833 and commenced practice in Connersville.

Kennedy then moved to Muncie (then Muncytown or Muncietown), Indiana, in 1834 and continued the practice of law. He served as member of the Indiana House of Representatives in 1835 and served in the Indiana Senate in 1838.

Congress 
Kennedy was elected as a Democrat to the Twenty-seventh, Twenty-eighth, and Twenty-ninth Congresses (March 4, 1841 – March 3, 1847).

Death 
He served as Democratic caucus nominee for United States Senator in 1847.  He was stricken with smallpox on the eve of the legislative joint convention and died in Indianapolis, Indiana, December 31, 1847.

He was interred in Greenlawn Cemetery.  He was reinterred in Beech Grove Cemetery, Muncie, Indiana.

References

1810 births
1847 deaths
Deaths from smallpox
Democratic Party members of the Indiana House of Representatives
Democratic Party Indiana state senators
Indiana lawyers
Politicians from Dayton, Ohio
Democratic Party members of the United States House of Representatives from Indiana
People from Tippecanoe County, Indiana
People from Connersville, Indiana
19th-century American politicians
19th-century American lawyers